This is a list of active Spanish Navy ships, complete and correct as of December 2016. There are approximately 139 vessels in the Navy, including minor auxiliary vessels. A breakdown includes; one amphibious assault ship (also used as an aircraft carrier), two amphibious transport docks, 11 frigates, two submarines, six mine countermeasure vessels, 22 patrol vessels and a number of auxiliary ships. The total displacement of the Spanish Navy is approximately 225,000 tonnes.

Submarine fleet

Surface fleet

Aircraft carrier and Amphibious warfare

Major surface combatants

Patrol

Mine countermeasures

Auxiliary fleet

Replenishment

Transport, sealift

EW support ship

Submarine rescue ship

Tugs

Polar research ships

Hydrographic ships

Training

Small training ships

 A72 Arosa (1981) (ex-Algoma 1931)
 A74 La Graciosa (1988) (ex-Dejá vu)
 A75 Sisargas (1995) (ex-Isabelle 1982)
 A76 Giralda (1993) (ex-Juan de Borbon's yacht), 1958)
 A78 Peregrina (2007)
 A82 Contramaestre Navarrete (1983)
 A83 Contramaestre Sanchez Fernandez (1983)
 A84 Contramaestre Antero (1984)
 A85 Contramaestre Lamadrid (1984)
 A121 Guardiamarina Barrutia (2006)
 A122 Guardiamarina Chereguini (2006)
 A123 Guardiamarina Rull (2007)
 A124 Guardiamarina Salas (2007)
 Approximately 90 patrol boats of the Maritime Component of the Servicio de Vigilancia Aduanera are technically classified as Spanish Navy Auxiliary vessels.

See also
 Servicio de Vigilancia Aduanera – For details on another maritime organisation of Spain

References

Ships of the Spanish Navy
Lists of ships of Spain
Spain